The S9G reactor is a naval reactor used by the United States Navy to provide electricity generation and propulsion on Virginia class submarines.  The S9G designation stands for:

 S, Submarine platform
 9, Ninth generation core designed by the contractor
 G, General Electric was the contracted designer

Design 

This pressurized water reactor (PWR) style nuclear reactor, designed by Knolls Atomic Power Laboratory (then managed by General Electric), is designed to have increased energy density, and new plant components, including a new steam generator design featuring improved corrosion resistance and reduced life-cycle costs. The steam generator will alleviate the corrosion concerns encountered in existing designs of steam generators, while reducing component size and weight and providing greater flexibility in overall arrangement. The reactor is designed to operate for 33 years without refueling.

The reactor is estimated to generate 210 megawatts (MWt)  driving a 30 MW pump-jet propulsion system built by BAE Systems that was designed for the Royal Navy and entered service on the second Trafalgar class submarine, also featuring on the Astute-class submarine.

References

United States naval reactors